Prades may refer to:

Places
France
 Prades, Ardèche, in the Ardèche département, France
 Prades, Ariège, in the Ariège département, France
 Prades, Haute-Loire, in the Haute-Loire département, France
 Prades, Pyrénées-Orientales (Prada de Conflent in Catalan), in the Pyrénées-Orientales département, France
 Prades, Tarn, in the Tarn département, France
 Prades, in the commune of Sainte-Enimie, in the Lozère département, France
 Prades-d'Aubrac, in the Aveyron département, France
 Prades-le-Lez, in the Hérault département, France
 Prades-Salars, in the Aveyron département, France
 Prades-sur-Vernazobre, in the Hérault département, France
 Saint-Cirgues-de-Prades, in the Ardèche département, France
 Arrondissement of Prades, in the Pyrénées-Orientales département, France
 Canton of Prades, in the Pyrénées-Orientales département, France

Spain
 Prades, Baix Camp, a municipality in the Baix Camp comarca, in the province of Tarragona, Catalonia, Spain
 Vilanova de Prades, a municipality in the province of Tarragona, Catalonia, Spain
 Prades Mountains, near Prades, Spain

People
 Eduard Pons Prades or Floreado Barsino (1920–2007), Spanish writer and historian
 Jean-Martin de Prades (c. 1720–1782), French theologian
 Josep Prades i Gallent (1689–1757), Spanish organist and composer
 Laurent Prades (born 1968), French tennis player
 Margaret of Prades (1388/95 – 1429), queen consort of King Martin I of Aragon
 Prades Tavernier (late thirteenth–early fourteenth century), French weaver and Cathar Perfect

See also
 Prade, Slovenia
 Laprade (disambiguation)